Buddhism in Nicaragua has existed since the late 19th century, after immigration from countries with Buddhist populations, mainly China. Although sources are not readily available, Buddhists are believed to constitute 0.1% of the total population in Nicaragua.

History
Buddhism was brought to Nicaragua in the late 19th century when the Chinese started arriving, many of which came from Guǎngdōng (广东) province.

See also
 Buddhism in Central America
 Buddhism in Costa Rica
 Buddhism in Canada
 Buddhism in Mexico
 Buddhism in the United States
 Buddhism in Brazil
 Buddhism in Argentina
 Buddhism in Venezuela
 Chinese Nicaraguan

References

External links
El Nuevo Diario Budismo en Nicaragua 
Centros de Budismo en Nicaragua 

SAMU - Zen Lab 

Religion in Nicaragua
Nicaragua